Rocca Santa Maria  is a town and comune in the province of Teramo, Abruzzo, eastern Italy. It is located in the Gran Sasso e Monti della Laga National Park. The municipal seat is in the frazione of Imposte.

See also
Martese
Serra (Rocca Santa Maria)

References

External links

Cities and towns in Abruzzo